Symphoricarpos guatemalensis is a Central American species of flowering plant in the honeysuckle family. It has been found only in Guatemala.

Symphoricarpos guatemalensis is an erect branching shrub sometimes as much as 2 meters (80 inches) tall. Leaves are tiny, rarely more than 6 mm (0.24 inch) long. It has white flowers and white fruits.

References

External links
photo of herbarium specimen at Missouri Botanical Garden, collected in Guatemala in 1965

guatemalensis
Plants described in 1994
Flora of Guatemala